Wila Apachita (Aymara wila blood, blood-red, apachita the place of transit of an important pass in the principal routes of the Andes; name in the Andes for a stone cairn built along the trail in the high mountains, "red apachita", also spelled Huila Apacheta, Wila Apacheta) is a  mountain in the Bolivian Andes. It is located in the Cochabamba Department, Tapacari Province. Wila Apachita lies southeast of Ñuñu Qullu.

References 

Mountains of Cochabamba Department